BB3 may refer to:

BB3, a postcode district the BB postcode area
Bombesin-like receptor 3, also known as BB3
Big Brother 3 (disambiguation), a television programme in various versions
BB3 (film), a 2021 Indian Telugu-language film directed by Boyapati Srinu